F. C. Hibberd & Co Ltd was a British locomotive-building company founded in 1927 to build industrial petrol and diesel locomotives.

Kent Construction and Engineering Co of Ashford, Kent had been reconditioning and reselling former military locomotives sold off as surplus at the end of World War I, though its had also developed its own narrow gauge locomotive design. It closed its works in 1926 and two of the directors of Honeywill Brothers Limited - F.C. Hibberd and D.A. Dwyer (Honeywill had marketed the Kent Construction locomotives) bought out the Kent Construction Business and its stock of locomotives, and in 1927 formed F.C. Hibberd & Co Ltd. In 1932 the company acquired the goodwill of James and Frederick Howard Limited and the company moved to Park Royal, London, and began manufacturing locomotives.

Many of Hibberd's locomotives were small machines with final drive by roller chain but it also built some larger ones with side-rod drive.  The latter bore a strong resemblance to Hudswell Clarke products.

Hibberd used the name Planet for their locomotives but this should not be confused with the much earlier Planet steam locomotive.

Other companies
From 1956 Thomas Hill, sold Hibberd locomotives to non-Hibberd customers on an informal commission basis until 1960. The relationship ended because Hibberd were becoming worried that Thomas Hill would sell their own locomotives to customers in preference to the Hibberd product.

The company was acquired by Butterley Engineering in the early 1960s and in 1964 production was moved to Ripley, Derbyshire. The last locomotive built to a Hibberd design was delivered in 1968.

History of the Planet name
The origin of the "Planet" petrol locomotive can be traced back to the Kent Construction and Engineering Company of Ashford, Kent. After World War I, Kent Construction purchased a large number of Government-surplus petrol locomotives which they reconditioned and offered for sale. These included both Motor Rail "Simplex" and American Baldwin Locomotive Works products. Kent Construction later produced a range of locomotives to their own designs. These were based on the Motor Rail "Simplex" but were given the name "Planet". They were sold through Honeywill Brothers of London.

Kent Construction closed in 1926 and "Planet" locomotives were then manufactured by Stableford and Company, wagon builders, of Coalville, Leicestershire until they went out of business in 1928. From this time "Planet" locomotives were built by Bedford Engineering Co Ltd, makers of rail and other cranes, of Ampthill Road, Bedford but they failed in 1932, as did the adjacent huge iron works of James and Frederick Howard whose products had included both narrow gauge and standard gauge locomotives since the mid-1920s. "Planet" locomotives were then built by Hibberd in Park Royal, London including models based closely on the designs obtained from Howard of Bedford.

In 1935, Hibberd diversified with the production of a light wheeled tractor for use in or between factories, or on the road. This was available initially with a 4-cylinder petrol engine and either pneumatic or solid tyres - layout was conventional with front steering and driven rear axle. The Hibberd light truck was introduced in 1937 with the Model B (of 2 ton capacity) and Model C (of 25-30 cwt capacity) - which were available with fixed or elevating load platforms and with 8 hp petrol or 10 hp horizontally opposed oil engines. Steering and driving was by the closely spaced front wheels. The original tractor design continued in production during and after WW2 and was available with a variety of engines, including a Ford 4-cylinder industrial petrol engine or an oil engine. A flameproof version was available for working in potentially explosive areas. A number of these were bought by British European Airways in 1947 to tow aircraft. The diesel engined version of these tractors (equipped with Fowler-Sanders 2DX engines) was to be adopted by Butlins Holiday Camps and Whipsnade Zoo to tow trains of up to 6 passenger trailers each carrying 12 people. The Butlins trailers were made by Barnards Ltd of Norwich and had vacuum servo brakes operated from the tractor. In 1950 the Fowler engine in the diesel versions of the "Planet" tractor was replaced by the Turner V-twin diesel engine with 4 speed integral gearbox.

A newspaper article about the Hibberd Works in 1951 stated that the Park Royal factory was responsible for design and assembly of the locomotives and tractors, with manufacture of the big components being "farmed out" all over the country. The finished products were assembled at Park Royal with parts from as many as 200 different suppliers. The tractors were still available with solid or pneumatic tyres, petrol (Ford) or diesel engines, and the flameproof version of the diesel tractor specially designed for use in explosives magazines (one of which is pictured being assembled destined for the Indian Army).

The road tractors and the rail locomotives seem to have been numbered in the same sequence.

Preservation in the United Kingdom

Railway Locomotives 
Sources for this list include the UK Heritage Railways database. All locomotives are standard gauge except where shown in the notes:

Planet Tractors/Trucks 

A number of these exist in private ownership. They are very sturdily built.

Preservation in Ireland

"Nippy" a former Mines and Safety Research engine from Buxton, Derbyshire, works number 2014 and built in 1936, is currently preserved at the Stradbally Woodland Express Railway. It is run on occasion for demonstration purposes. Several Guinness brewery Planets have been preserved also, surviving in the Guinness Storehouse museum, The Ulster Folk and Transport Museum in Cultra Co. Down, and three at the Cavan & Leitrim Railway in Dromod. The former Irish Shell No 23 is preserved at RPSI Whitehead.

Preservation in Italy
Locomotive 3944, built in 1960 is now located as a static 'gate guardian' display at the premises of Vaia Car, Calvisano, in Italy.

Preservation in Australia

Australia

In 1976, The Western Australian Light Railway Preservation Society acquired a 1939 model Planet Locomotive from the Kalgoorlie Lake View and Star Gold mine for a total of $500AU, including spares. After considerable restoration work, the locomotive was moved to Whiteman Park in Perth in 1983 and moved under its own power for the first time in 1985. In recent years, the WA Light Railway Preservation Society bought a 1962 model planet locomotive.

The 1939 Planet (now known as Planet #7) is now the mainstay of the Bennett Brook Railway's Diesel Fleet. The 1962 Planet (now known as Planet #8) is now also operational at Bennett Brook Railway. Both locomotives run on 2' gauge track. Over the years, multiple modifications have been made to both of Bennett Brook Railway's Planets, including: The installation of a Vacuum brake system, the addition of a Jones Coupler style coupler along with the already installed Link and Pin couplers and Raising the roof of the cab on Planet #7, and a new cab design and paint scheme to reflect its operating heritage on Planet #8.

Another preserved Planet locomotive is #54 at the Richmond Vale railway line, New South Wales.

New Zealand
Two Planet locomotives from the Grassmere Salt Works are preserved at the Ferrymead Two Foot Railway in New Zealand. Another is preserved at a pioneer village in Kaikohe.
One is preserved at Pukemiro

References

Hibberd